Khatunarkh may refer to:
Gay, Armenia, formerly Khatunarkh
Nerkin Khatunarkh, Armenia
Aknashen, Armenia, formerly Verin Khatunarkh